The 2011 Kenyan Nationwide League was the 48th season of the Kenyan Nationwide League.

Oserian and Muhoroni Youth finished top in their zones, but the latter's promotion was heavily questioned, as the KFF Nationwide League season was inconclusive. Former KFF chairman Mohamed Hatimy said that Muhoroni Youth's promotion was unconstitutional as the league they played in was "unknown". He continued to say that there was only one Nationwide League; that run by the FKL and any promoted teams should have come from the FKL Nationwide League.

Red Berets had been relegated from the Premier League the previous season, but disbanded as they were under immense pressure from their sponsors to produce good performances.

League tables

FKL Nationwide League

KFF Nationwide League

References

2
2011